Nunguni is a small town in Makueni County, Kenya.

References 

Populated places in Eastern Province (Kenya)
Makueni County